Courtomer is a commune in the Seine-et-Marne department in the Île-de-France region in north-central France.

Demographics
The inhabitants are called Courtomerois.

See also
Communes of the Seine-et-Marne department

References

External links

Official website 
2003 Land Use from IAU IdF (Institut d'Aménagement et d'Urbanisme, Île-de-France) 
 

Communes of Seine-et-Marne